Bjorndal is a surname. Notable people with the surname include:

Arne Bjørndal (1882–1965), Norwegian musician and folklorist
Karen Bjorndal, American biologist
Magnus Bjorndal (1899–1971), American engineer and inventor
Martin Tore Bjørndal (1944–2015), Norwegian diplomat
Trond Bjørndal (born 1969), Norwegian footballer and manager